Harry Shum Jr. (born April 28, 1982) is a Costa Rican-American actor, dancer, choreographer, and singer. He is best known for his roles as Mike Chang on the Fox television series Glee (2009–15), Benson Kwan on the ABC television series Grey's Anatomy (2022–), and as Magnus Bane on the Freeform television series Shadowhunters (2016–19). He was nominated for six Screen Actors Guild Awards for best ensemble performance in Crazy Rich Asians, Glee and Everything Everywhere All At Once, winning for the latter two. Shum won the award for The Male TV Star of 2018 in the E! People's Choice Awards for Shadowhunters.

Shum has appeared in the films Step Up 2: The Streets (2008), Step Up 3D (2010), White Frog (2012), Revenge of the Green Dragons (2014), Crouching Tiger, Hidden Dragon: Sword of Destiny (2016), Crazy Rich Asians (2018), the Hulu web series The Legion of Extraordinary Dancers (2010–2011) and the YouTube Originals series Single by 30 (2016). In 2020, he starred in Universal's romantic drama All My Life. In 2021 Shum starred in the thriller Broadcast Signal Intrusion and appeared in Netflix's holiday rom-com Love Hard. In 2022, Shum had a supporting role in A24's critically acclaimed film Everything Everywhere All At Once which won the Academy Award for Best Picture, and is set to star in a Crazy Rich Asians spinoff centered around his and Gemma Chan's characters.

Early life
Shum was born in Limón, Costa Rica, the son of Chinese immigrants. His mother is a native of Hong Kong and his father is from Guangzhou, China. They relocated to Costa Rica, where Shum and his two older sisters were born. When Shum was six years old, the family moved to San Francisco, California. He stated, "I feel I have the best of so many worlds. I speak Spanish and Cantonese. Spanish is actually my first language before I learned Cantonese and English." He later stated that he has not spoken Spanish fluently since the age of 6.

Shum spent most of his schooling years in San Luis Obispo County, California and graduated from Arroyo Grande High School in 2000. Initially, he had been more interested in theater and sports but found a passion for dance after auditioning for his high school dance team on a dare. Shum attended San Francisco State University for a year, before dropping out to pursue a dance career. In an interview, he said that his earliest motivations to dance were from watching Ginuwine, Dru Hill, and Usher, before becoming influenced by dancers like Gene Kelly and Michael Jackson.

Career

2002–07: Dancer beginnings 
Shum began his dance career in Los Angeles. As a 18-year-old, he was spotted by choreographers Rosero McCoy and Jamal Sims to go on a UK tour with the singer Kaci. He steadily built his career, appearing as the only male dancer on BET's Comic View, and starred in a series of Apple iPod advertisements as dancing silhouettes. He joined Beyoncé, Alicia Keys, and Missy Elliott in their co-headlining tour Ladies First in 2004, while working as a backup dancer for artists including Jennifer Lopez, Jessica Simpson, and Mariah Carey. He appeared in several music videos of songs including Lose My Breath by Destiny's Child and It's Like That by Mariah Carey. Shum also worked as a dance instructor.

2008–14: Turn to acting, Glee, The LXD 
Since 2008, Shum was given roles in Step Up 2 and later Step Up 3D, both directed by Jon M. Chu. From 2009 until 2015, he portrayed the role of Mike Chang, a dancer who joins the glee club, on the Fox musical comedy-drama series Glee. Known for a while as "Other Asian" on Glee, he was given very few lines during the show's first season. Partly due to the enthusiasm from fans during his appearances on the live tour taking place after the first season concluded, Shum's character was given storylines in the second season, mostly involving his relationship with fellow glee club member Tina Cohen-Chang (Jenna Ushkowitz). He subsequently gave performances of "Make 'Em Laugh" in "The Substitute", "Sing" from A Chorus Line in "Duets", "Valerie" in "Special Education", and the show's first dance solo in "A Night of Neglect". He was promoted from guest star to series regular for the third season. He was given a major storyline in the third episode of the season, "Asian F", and performed "Cool" from West Side Story, his first solo song. On June 28, 2013, it was reported that Shum would not return as regular on Glee fifth season, but would be a recurring guest star.

Shum worked as both a choreographer and a dancer for the dance group The LXD. Along with Chrisopher Scott, Harry choreographed performances during the Ellen's Even Bigger Really Big Show, the 82nd Academy Awards and So You Think You Can Dance. The LXD also worked as the opening act for the Glee Live! In Concert! tour starting in May 2010. A mini web series of the same name and starring The LXD was created by Jon M. Chu, with Shum again taking the position of the choreographer and portrayed Elliot, while also writing the script for one of the episodes.

Shum has been featured in many productions of Wong Fu Productions. In 2011, Shum starred in a short action film, 3 Minutes, directed by Ross Ching and produced by Don Le and George Wang. In 2012 he starred in White Frog, a comedy-drama film directed by Quentin Lee. Subsequently, Shum was cast in the role of the Kuai Liang (the younger Sub-Zero) in the second season of Mortal Kombat: Legacy. Harry had a major role in crime drama film Revenge of the Green Dragons, which was executive produced by Martin Scorsese. Shum was also the judge on the reality competition television series Face Off.

2015–18: Shadowhunters and other films 
In 2016, Shum appeared as the character Wei-Fang in the Netflix American–Chinese martial arts film Crouching Tiger, Hidden Dragon: Sword of Destiny, a sequel to Crouching Tiger, Hidden Dragon (1999). Shum was also cast as the male lead, Peter Ma, in Single By 30, a YouTube Red original series from Wong Fu Productions and New Form Digital after starring in the original pilot in 2015. The first season of the series premiered on August 24, 2016, on Wong Fu Productions' Channel.

Shum scored a primary role in the Freeform series, Shadowhunters, and portrayed the centuries-old warlock Magnus Bane between 2016 and 2019. The show was based on Cassandra Clare's best-selling young adult fantasy series, The Mortal Instruments. His portrayal of Bane, a bisexual man of color, helped Shadowhunters win the 2017 GLAAD media award for an "Outstanding Drama Series", which he accepted with his co-star Matthew Daddario. Shum also received the Bisexual Representation Award (BiRA) for "Best Bisexual Representation of a Supporting Character" in both 2017 and 2018 hosted by FluidStyleCo. Shum won the award for The Male TV Star of 2018 in the E! People's Choice Awards for his role as Magnus Bane in Shadowhunters.

Alongside his work in Shadowhunters, he received supporting roles in films including Escape Plan: The Extractors and Burn. In 2018, Shum was cast as Charlie Wu in Jon M. Chu's Crazy Rich Asians, and despite most of his scenes being cut due to the desire to focus on one romantic pairing, he appears briefly in a mid-credits scene, hinting at a romantic link to one of the characters, Astrid Leong-Teo.

2019–present 
In 2019, Shum appeared in 4 episodes of Tell Me a Story which premiered in December 2019. In March 2020, Shum guest starred in an episode of Comedy Central's Awkwafina is Nora from Queens. On December 4, the romantic drama All My Life was released in US theaters, followed by a premium video-on-demand release on December 23, and a streaming release on HBO Max on August 7, 2021.

Conspiracy thriller Broadcast Signal Intrusion, in which Shum starred and served as an executive producer, premiered to critical acclaim at South by Southwest Film Festival in March 2021 and was released On Demand and in select theaters on October 22, 2021. Shum appeared in Netflix's holiday romantic comedy Love Hard which was released on November 5, 2021. In the film, the actor played Jimmy O. Yang's character's brother, Owen Lin, and was praised by the audience for his comic timing. 

In March 2022, Shum appeared in a supporting role in the critically acclaimed Academy Award winner, Everything Everywhere All At Once. Michelle Yeoh called Shum "the most incredible physical comedian ever", referring to his performance in the film. On May 6, 2022, Deadline reported that a Crazy Rich Asians spinoff is in early development at Warner Bros. and is set to focus on the relationship between Astrid Leong-Teo and Charlie Wu, played respectively by Gemma Chan and Shum. Starting October 2022, Shum joined the cast of Grey's Anatomy season 19 as surgical intern Dr. Benson "Blue" Kwan.

Shum also turned to voiceover work. He made a guest appearance in Audible's fiction podcast Christmas Delivery, as well as in the Paramount+ animated series Star Trek: Lower Decks, voicing the character of Rawda. In 2022, Shum starred in and executive produced Realm's fiction podcast series Echo Park, which was nominated for Best Fiction Podcast at the iHeart Podcast Awards. In 2023, Shum voiced Brainiac 5 in DC's animated film set in the Tomorrowverse, Legion of Super-Heroes.

Personal life 
Shum began a relationship with actress and dancer Shelby Rabara in 2006. The two were engaged in October 2013 while on vacation in Hawaii and were married on November 22, 2015, in Costa Rica. They have a daughter.

Shum has stated that he identifies as being somewhat Latino. He said, "It's strange that I am full Chinese and born in a Latin country, but I love the fact that I was immersed in that culture at birth while maintaining my Chinese roots."

Filmography

Film

Television

Other

Awards and nominations

Discography

References

External links

 
 

1982 births
Living people
American male actors of Chinese descent
American dancers of Asian descent
21st-century American male actors
American people of Costa Rican descent
Male actors from San Francisco
American choreographers
American male film actors
American film actors of Asian descent
American people of Chinese descent
American people of Hong Kong descent
American male dancers
American musicians of Chinese descent
American male television actors
Costa Rican emigrants to the United States
Musicians from the San Francisco Bay Area
People from Limón Province
Costa Rican people of Chinese descent
Costa Rican people of Hong Kong descent
San Francisco State University alumni
Hispanic and Latino American male actors
Hispanic and Latino American dancers
Hispanic and Latino American musicians
Outstanding Performance by a Cast in a Motion Picture Screen Actors Guild Award winners